Kavir is a village in East Azerbaijan Province, Iran.

Kavir ( 'salt marsh') may also refer to:
 Kavir-e Bala, a village in Kerman Province
 Dasht-e Kavir, a desert
 Kavir Buzurg, centre of the above desert
 Kavir National Park, part of the desert
 Kavir Rural District (disambiguation)
 Kavir (book), a book by Ali Shariati